Luis Filipe, Luis Felipe, or Luiz Felipe, can refer to:

Luís Filipe, Prince Royal of Portugal (1887–1908), eldest son of King Dom Carlos I
Luis Felipe Ramón y Rivera (1913–1993), Venezuelan composer, teacher, musician, folklorist and writer
Luis Felipe Bravo Mena (born 1952), Mexican politician
Luis Felipe Tovar (born 1961), Mexican performance teacher and actor
Luis Felipe (gang leader) (born 1961), former leader of the Latin Kings
Luís Figo (born 1972), retired Portuguese football midfielder
Luís Filipe (footballer, born 1979), Portuguese football defender/midfielder
Luís Felipe (footballer, born 1991), Brazilian football defender
Luiz Felipe (footballer, born 1985), Brazilian football defender
Luiz Felipe (footballer, born 1993), Brazilian football defender
Luiz Felipe (footballer, born March 1997), Italian football defender
Luiz Felipe (footballer, born April 1997), Brazilian football goalkeeper
Luis Felipe Fernandes (born 1996), Brazilian-American football midfielder
Luiz Filipe (footballer, born 2001), Brazilian football midfielder/forward

See also
Felipe (disambiguation) (Spanish)
Filipe (Portuguese)
Filipe Luís Kasmirski, Brazilian football defender
Louis Philip (disambiguation)
Philip (name) (English)